The Mont Ham is a mountain in the southern Notre Dame Mountains (part of the Appalachians), in the municipality of Ham-Sud, in the Les Sources Regional County Municipality, in region of Estrie, in Quebec, Canada.

Mount Ham is located in Saint-Joseph-de-Ham-Sud, very close to Ham-Nord, in the Eastern Townships (Cantons-de-l'Est) in Quebec and is managed by a non-profit organization, "Le développement du Mont Ham". The mission of the organization is to promote the fauna and flora of the region as well as to create new services and activities that meet the needs of the community and the clientele. The Mount Ham site is also a center for community initiatives.

Geography 
It is part of the lowlands of the Appalachians.

Marked trails on the mountain permit visitors a 360 degree view of the surrounding landscape.

Activities
The park in which it is situated is open year-round and offers hiking, scrambling, snowshoeing, cross-country skiing, disc golf, and camping. In 2014, the park became the first in the Eastern Townships to gain "regional park" status, along with a $1,367,250 grant for expansion and improvements.

Geology
While its rocks are considerably older, Mont Ham is surrounded by moraine that was deposited approximately 12,200 years BP during glaciation. The bedrock of the mountain is composed of boninite in an ophiolite complex.

Toponym 
The toponym "Mont Ham Regional Park" is linked to the name of the mountain. The latest toponym was made official on December 5, 1968 at the Place Names Bank of the Commission de toponymie du Québec.

See also 
Mont-Ham Regional Park
List of mountains of Quebec

References

External links
 Official website
 Peakbagger.com page

Landforms of Estrie
Ham
Tourist attractions in Estrie